Otto Oscar Wiegand (July 9, 1860 in Hka, Wisconsin – ?) was a member of the Wisconsin State Assembly. In 1888, he settled in Shawano, Wisconsin.

Career
Wiegand was elected to the Assembly in 1890. Previously, he had been town clerk of Washington, Shawano County, Wisconsin from 1885 to 1888 and a justice of the peace from 1886 to 1888. Also in 1888, Wiegand was an unsuccessful candidate for county clerk of Shawano County, Wisconsin. He was a Democrat.

References

People from Manitowoc County, Wisconsin
People from Shawano, Wisconsin
City and town clerks
American justices of the peace
1860 births
Year of death missing
Democratic Party members of the Wisconsin State Assembly